The 713th Infantry Division (German: 713. Infanteriedivision) was a German Army infantry division in World War II.

History 
The 713th Infantry Division was raised in May 1941 under the command of Generalmajor Franz Fehn. It was first used in September, where it was moved to the Balkans for standard occupational duties in southern Greece and Crete. The division was disestablished on 15 January 1942 and reformed into the first Crete Brigade.

References

Military units and formations established in 1941
Military units and formations disestablished in 1942
Infantry divisions of Germany during World War II